J.Sheon (born 24 December 1985) is a Taiwanese rapper, singer and producer. J.Sheon debuted with his self-titled album J.Sheon街巷 in May 2017. In 2018, he won the Billboard Radio China Top New Artist Awards 2017.

Career
J.Sheon, an alumnus of Queensborough Community College, moved to New York at the age of 19 and spent eight years there. According to him, he started to produce music because he was bored.

In 2012 or 2013, he suddenly decided to take his music career more serious and moved back to Taiwan. He did cover See You Again in Mandarin on YouTube which became popular.

He signed up with Sony Music Taiwan and in 2017 debuted with his self-titled album J.Sheon街巷.

In 2018, he won the Billboard Radio China Top New Artist Awards 2017.

Discography

Album 
 J.Sheon街巷 (May 2017)
 The Alley巷子內 (November 2019)

References 

1985 births
Living people
Taiwanese male singers
Taiwanese singer-songwriters